Youth of the People's Party  (YPP, ML), known also as the Young Populars (YP) is a political youth organisation in the Czech Republic for students and young people from 15 to 35 years of age and is the official youth wing of the Christian and Democratic Union – Czechoslovak People's Party, often shortened to  ('the populars'). YPP was founded in 2012 and has 420 members today. It is based on christian values. The chairwoman of the organisation is Helena Martinková, and the official slogan is "We make the world a better place".

Youth of the People's Party builds on continuity of the historical organizations of the party such as Young Generation the Czechoslovak People's Party existed in 1927–1938 and  Youth of the Czechoslovak People's Party existed in the 1945–1948.

In June 2021, former organisation Young Christian Democrats existed in 1998–2021 merged with the Youth of the People's Party and making it only youth wing of the party.

List of Presidents 
 Petr Hladík, 2012–2015
 Vladimír Hanáček, 2015–2017
 Filip Chvátal, 2017–2019
 Václav Pláteník, 2019–2021
 Radovan Gaudyn, 2021–2022
 Helena Martinková, 2022–present

Board members (2022–present) 
YPP President
 Helena Martinková

YPP First Vice-President for Membership
 Patrik Cibere 

YPP Vice-President for Foreign Affairs (International Secretary)
 Vít Mikušek

YPP Vice-President for PR
 Anna Palánová 

YPP Vice-President for Projects and Finance
 Matěj Kos

YPP Secretary General
 Tomáš Konečný

Activities 
The organisation is active all year round and offers a wide range of events from teambuilding meetings through balls, trips, policy seminars, political workshops, lectures, debates to nationwide conferences. The main goal of all events is personal development of man. The flagship event of the YPP is the Summer Camp, which is held regularly every year.

References

External links 
 Official homepage of Mladí lidovci 

Politics of the Czech Republic
Youth politics
2012 establishments in the Czech Republic
Youth wings of political parties in the Czech Republic
KDU-ČSL
Youth wings of conservative parties